Splendrillia karukeraensis is a species of sea snail, a marine gastropod mollusk in the family Drilliidae.

Description
The length of the shell attains 12 mm.

Distribution
This marine species occurs in the Caribbean Sea off Guadeloupe.

References

 Fallon P.J. (2016). Taxonomic review of tropical western Atlantic shallow water Drilliidae (Mollusca: Gastropoda: Conoidea) including descriptions of 100 new species. Zootaxa. 4090(1): 1–363

External links
 

karukeraensis
Gastropods described in 2016